Halohasta (common abbreviation Hht.) is a genus of halophilic archaea in the family of Halorubraceae.

References

Archaea genera
Taxa described in 2013
Euryarchaeota